Toni van Eyck (1910–1988) was a German stage and film actress.

Selected filmography
 Spring Awakening (1929)
 Revolt in the Reformatory (1929)
 Painted Youth (1929)
 A Woman Branded (1931)
 Spoiling the Game (1932)
 What Men Know (1933)
 Call Over the Air (1951)

References

Bibliography
 Taylor, Richard. Film Propaganda: Soviet Russia and Nazi Germany. I.B.Tauris, 1998.

External links

1910 births
1988 deaths
German film actresses
German stage actresses
20th-century German actresses
Actors from Koblenz